KAJS-LD, virtual channel 33 (UHF digital channel 32), is a low-powered Buzzr-affiliated television station serving Omaha, Nebraska, United States that is licensed to Lincoln. The station is owned by HC2 Holdings. KAJS is a sister station to KQMK-LD.

History
The station's construction permit was initially issued on June 2, 2010 under the calls of K32JS-D. The current KAJS-LD calls were assigned on May 30, 2013.

The station identification placard presently in use on-air denotes Omaha.

Court TV was replaced with Buzzr when Court TV moved to KMTV as a subchannel.

Grit TV on 33.3 was replaced in early 2022 with Newsy when Grit TV moved to KMTV as a subchannel.

In February 2023, NTD America moved from 33.5 to KAJS-LD on 25.2.

Digital channels
The station's signal is multiplexed:

References

External links
DTV America

Low-power television stations in the United States
Innovate Corp.
Television stations in Omaha, Nebraska
Television channels and stations established in 2013
2013 establishments in Nebraska
Court TV affiliates
Bounce TV affiliates
Grit (TV network) affiliates
GetTV affiliates